Dokos is a small Greek island of the Argo-Saronic Gulf, adjacent to Hydra, and separated from the Peloponnese by a narrow strait called, on some maps, "the Hydra Gulf." It is part of the municipality of Ýdra (Hydra) in Islands regional unit and reported a population of 18 persons at the 2011 census. The island is populated only by some Orthodox monks and perennial sheep herders. The island is rocky, reaching a height of 308 metres.
During the ancient times it was called Aperopia (Ἀπεροπία).

Archaeology
It has, since the ancient years, considered to be a strategic location. On the east side lie the ruins of a great Byzantine - Venetian Castle. During the Middle Ages, the island served as a refuge for Albanian settlers' animals.

Dokos, according to archaeological studies, has been inhabited since Chalcolithic, 6000 BC. In 1975, Peter Throckmorton discovered a wreck near Dokos that has been dated to about 2150 BC, and may be the oldest shipwreck known.

Historical population

References

External links
Official website of Municipality of Hydra (in Greek)
Hellenic Institute Of Marine Archaeology

Islands of Greece
Saronic Islands
Landforms of Islands (regional unit)
Islands of Attica